Egener is a surname. Notable people with the surname include:

Mike Egener (born 1984), Canadian ice hockey player
Minnie Egener (1881–1938), American operatic mezzo-soprano

See also
Egner